Got Your Six is the sixth studio album by American heavy metal band Five Finger Death Punch. It was released on September 4, 2015, by Prospect Park. Got Your Six sold 119,000 units to debut at number two on the Billboard 200. The 114,000 in pure album sales made it the top-selling album of the week and the band's best sales week to date. Got Your Six is also their third consecutive set to debut at number two.

Background 
In January 2015, the band announced they were recording a new album due in late 2015.

On May 2, 2015, they released the title of the new album as Got Your Six. On May 19, 2015, they released the art work for their new album and announced that the album will be released on August 28, 2015. They launched a preview for their new single titled "Jekyll and Hyde" in a special video message. They also announced the dates of a co-headlining North American Tour with Papa Roach and accompanied by In This Moment as special guests with support from From Ashes to New for the tour, during which they will promote the album. The release date was later moved back a week to September 4, 2015.

Drummer Jeremy Spencer said of the new album in an interview, "I'm digging it, man. It's actually more brutal, with more extreme dynamics. There are some really mellow parts and then some really brutal parts. So we're running the whole gamut of sounds.".

Reception

Selling 119,000 units in its first week, Got Your Six debuted at number two on the September 26, 2015, survey of the Billboard 200, and number one on the Top Rock Albums survey of the same date. Of the 119,000 units sold in its first week, 114,000 of them were pure album sales, making it the best-selling album of the week. It also became the band's best-selling album in terms of first-week sales, surpassing the 112,000 first-week sales of The Wrong Side of Heaven and the Righteous Side of Hell, Volume 1. It was certified Gold by the RIAA on August 8, 2016; and has sold more than 390,000 pure albums as of September 13, 2016.

The album was included at number 44 on Rock Sounds top 50 releases of 2015.

Track listing

Personnel
Band
 Ivan Moody – lead vocals
 Zoltan Bathory – rhythm guitar
 Jason Hook – lead guitar, backing vocals
 Chris Kael – bass, backing vocals, vocals on "Got Your Six"
 Jeremy Spencer – drums

Production
 Kevin Churko – production

Charts

Weekly charts

Year-end charts

Singles

Certifications

References 

 

2015 albums
Five Finger Death Punch albums
Albums produced by Kevin Churko